The canton of Billom is an administrative division of the Puy-de-Dôme department, central France. Its borders were modified at the French canton reorganisation which came into effect in March 2015. Its seat is in Billom.

It consists of the following communes:
 
Beauregard-l'Évêque
Billom
Bongheat
Bouzel
Chas
Chauriat
Égliseneuve-près-Billom
Espirat
Estandeuil
Fayet-le-Château
Glaine-Montaigut
Isserteaux
Mauzun
Montmorin
Neuville
Reignat
Saint-Bonnet-lès-Allier
Saint-Dier-d'Auvergne
Saint-Jean-des-Ollières
Saint-Julien-de-Coppel
Trézioux
Vassel
Vertaizon

References

Cantons of Puy-de-Dôme